Sosnytsia Raion  was a raion (district) of Chernihiv Oblast, northern Ukraine. Its administrative centre was located at the urban-type settlement of Sosnytsia. The raion was abolished on 18 July 2020 as part of the administrative reform of Ukraine, which reduced the number of raions of Chernihiv Oblast to five. The area of Sosnytsia Raion was merged into Koriukivka Raion. The last estimate of the raion population was 

At the time of disestablishment, the raion consisted of one hromada, Sosnytsia settlement hromada with the administration in Sosnytsia.

References

Former raions of Chernihiv Oblast
1935 establishments in Ukraine
Ukrainian raions abolished during the 2020 administrative reform